Demi Renee Harman (born 11 March 1993) is an Australian actress and television presenter. She is perhaps best known for her role as Sasha Bezmel in Home and Away. She was a contestant on the first series of Celebrity Splash!. Following her departure from Home and Away in 2015, Harman co-hosted Better Homes and Gardens and played Riley Hart in television drama Winners & Losers.

Early life
Harman was born in Brisbane, Australia in 1993 to an American father and an Australian mother, Carrie, who formerly worked as a weather girl on the Seven Network. She is the third of four children. Her older sister is American-Australian actress Brooke Harman, and she also has an older brother, Beau, and younger sister, Paige. When Harman was growing up, she lived between the United States and Australia, and at the age of nine she moved to Melbourne when her sister Brooke began working on television series Pirate Islands. Harman finished high school at Brisbane Adventist College in 2010 and was accepted into the University of Queensland for an arts/Japanese course. Japanese culture has been a great influence in her life after a holiday to Japan.

Career
Harman studied drama in high school and took Tom McSweeney acting classes. She began acting in 2010 with a role in Australian horror film Still Waters between 2010 and 2011.

In August 2011, Harman joined the main cast of Australian television soap opera Home and Away as rebellious teenager Sasha Bezmel, the illegitimate daughter of Sid Walker. Harman relocated to Sydney for the role.

In 2013, Harman was a contestant in the first Australian season of Celebrity Splash!. The following year, Harman announced her departure from Home and Away. She joined the presenting team of Better Homes and Gardens in 2015. That same year, she also joined the cast of Winners & Losers as Riley Hart. The role required her to relocate to Melbourne.

In 2021 Harman starred in Stan's original film Christmas on the Farm.

Personal life
Harman dated her former Home and Away co-star Alec Snow, who played Matt Page from 2013 to 2017. Harman announced her engagement to producer Andrew Brooks in July 2019, and they married in California in January 2022. In March 2023, Harman and Brooks announced they were expecting their first child.

Filmography

References

External links
 

1993 births
Living people
Actresses from Brisbane
Australian film actresses
Australian television actresses
Australian people of American descent